Katerina Tichy (born 11 June 1974) is a Canadian former alpine skier who competed in the 1998 Winter Olympics.

References

1974 births
Living people
Canadian female alpine skiers
Olympic alpine skiers of Canada
Alpine skiers at the 1998 Winter Olympics
Czech emigrants to Canada